The 2008 SAP Open doubles was a men's tennis tournament played on indoor hard courts in San Jose, California in the United States.

Eric Butorac and Jamie Murray were the defending champions. They were both present but did not compete together.
Butorac partnered with Todd Perry, but lost in the first round to Sanchai Ratiwatana and Sonchat Ratiwatana.
Murray partnered with Max Mirnyi, but lost in the quarterfinals to Steve Darcis and Kristof Vliegen.

Scott Lipsky and David Martin won in the final 7–6(7–4), 7–5, against Bob Bryan and Mike Bryan.

Seeds

Draw

Draw

External links
Draw

Doubles
2008 ATP Tour